Phlebia centrifuga is a species of crust fungus in the family Meruliaceae. It was described in 1881 by Petter Karsten.

References

Fungi described in 1881
Meruliaceae
Taxa named by Petter Adolf Karsten